The Wankinco River is a  river in eastern Massachusetts, United States.  It is a tributary of the Wareham River, which drains into Buzzards Bay.

Although now spelled Wankinco, it was previously written as Wankinquoah, which may have been derived from Wonqun, meaning "crooked".

During a portion of its course, it serves as the boundary between Carver and Plymouth, Massachusetts.

References 

 Save Buzzards Bay
 Lincoln Newton Kinnicutt, Indian Names of Places in Plymouth, Middleborough, Lakeville and Carver Plymouth County Massachusetts, 1909

Wareham, Massachusetts
Rivers of Plymouth County, Massachusetts
Rivers of Massachusetts